Joe Hollimon (born November 5, 1952 in Trumann, Arkansas) is a former defensive back for the Edmonton Eskimos of the Canadian Football League from 1976-1985. He won six Grey Cups while a member of the Eskimos.  He was a three-time Western Conference All-Star Corner Back (1976, 78, 82) and was a CFL All-Star in 1978.

External links
 Profile page on NFL.com

1952 births
Living people
American players of Canadian football
Arkansas State Red Wolves football players
Canadian football defensive backs
Edmonton Elks players
People from Trumann, Arkansas
Players of American football from Arkansas